Apolonio Lombardo Rangel (26 January 1934 – 16 September 2020) was a Panamanian footballer who played as a midfielder.

Career
Lombardo played club football for Oratorio Festivo, Santander, Unión Ibérico, Unión Española and La Garantía.

Lombardo played for the  Panama national team between 1953 and 1961, making his debut at the age of 19. He scored 4 goals in 17 games.

References

1934 births
2020 deaths
Panamanian footballers
Panama international footballers
Association football midfielders